The 1983 edition of the Campeonato Carioca kicked off on July 2, 1983 and ended on December 14, 1983. It is the official tournament organized by FFERJ (Federação de Futebol do Estado do Rio de Janeiro, or Rio de Janeiro State Football Federation. Only clubs based in the Rio de Janeiro State are allowed to play. Twelve teams contested this edition. Fluminense won the title for the 25th time. São Cristóvão and Bonsucesso were relegated.

System
The tournament would be divided in three stages:
 Taça Guanabara: The twelve teams all played in a single round-robin format against each other. The champions qualified to the Final phase. 
 Taça Rio: The twelve teams all played in a single round-robin format against each other. The champions qualified to the Final phase.
 Final phase: The champions of the two stages, plus the team with the best overall record would play that phase. each team played in a single round-robin format against each other and the team with the most points won the title.

Championship

Taça Guanabara

Taça Rio

Playoffs

Aggregate table

Finals

References

Campeonato Carioca seasons
Carioca